La Guiannée (or La Guignolée) is celebrated on December 31 (New Year's Eve)

It is a French medieval New Year's Eve tradition that is still practiced in two towns in the United States. The tradition related to poor people being able to ask the more wealthy for food and drink at the celebrations of winter. Customarily  a troupe of traveling male singers went from door to door to entertain and ring in the new year. Hosts were expected to give them food and drink. Other sources say the young men were seeking donations for Twelfth Night. Begun as a way for the poor to be given gratuities by the rich, it also became a community social event for young men to visit with the families of young women.

Over time, the practice became an occasion for visiting with relatives and friends and was more or less a traveling feast. At first it was carried on only by young men, often in costume; women joined the party in the 20th century. In many years, the people appeared in disguise, as part of the celebration was a kind of overturning of the common order.

This tradition has been practiced annually since 1722 in Prairie du Rocher, Illinois.  It has been revived in Ste. Genevieve, Missouri. Both were former French colonial villages settled by French Canadians in the eighteenth century.

In the latter town, current celebrations feature singers and musicians, attired in colonial dress, who begin their night's journey at the local American Legion Hall. They make their way through all the restaurants, bars, nursing homes and high school gyms, ending at midnight at the Knights of Columbus Hall.

Translation of the words of the traditional song, La Guignolée:

Good evening master and mistress,
And all who live with you.
  For the first day of the year, 
  You owe us La Guignolée.

  If you have nothing to give, 
  A chine of meat or so will do.
  A chine of meat is not a big thing, 
  Only ninety feet long.

  Again, we don't ask for very much,
  Only the oldest daughter of the house.
  We will give her lots of good cheer,
  And we will surely warm her feet.

  Now, we greet you,
  And beg you to forgive us please.
  If we have acted a little crazy, 
  We meant it in good fun.

  Another time we'll surely be careful
  To know when we must come back here again.
  Let us dance La Guenille, 
    -- La Guenille, La Guenille!''

References

Related links
PBS' The Mississippi: River of Song series website
News article from the Illinois Times
Web article from Illinois Periodicals Online

December events
French-Canadian culture in Missouri
French-American culture in Missouri
Missouri culture